Nsein is a town in the Western Region of Ghana. The town host the Nsein Senior High School and the operations of Ghana National Gas Corporation.

References

Populated places in the Western Region (Ghana)